Cornelius Andrew Cadmus (October 7, 1844 – January 20, 1902) was an American Democratic Party politician who represented New Jersey's 5th congressional district for two terms from 1891 to 1895.

Biography
Born at Dundee Lake (now part of Elmwood Park, New Jersey), Cadmus attended public schools in New Jersey. After finishing schooling, he engaged in the feed and grain business in Paterson, New Jersey. He served as a member of the New Jersey General Assembly in 1884 and 1885, as well as Sheriff of Passaic County 1887-1890.

Cadmus was elected as a Democrat to the Fifty-second and Fifty-third Congresses (March 4, 1891 – March 3, 1895), but did not put himself forward as a candidate for renomination in 1894. He resumed his former business pursuits while also serving as a member of the board of inspectors of the New Jersey prison.

He died in Paterson, January 20, 1902, and was interred in Cedar Lawn Cemetery in Paterson.

Notes

References

1844 births
1902 deaths
Democratic Party members of the New Jersey General Assembly
People from Elmwood Park, New Jersey
Politicians from Paterson, New Jersey
Democratic Party members of the United States House of Representatives from New Jersey
Burials at Cedar Lawn Cemetery
19th-century American politicians